Moonlight, Mistletoe & You is a studio album by American blues musician Keb' Mo' and was released on  October 18, 2019 by Concord Records label. The album contains a collection of 10 Christmas songs.  Guest musicians include Gerald Albright (saxophone) on "Moonlight, Mistletoe and You" and Melissa Manchester (vocals) on "I've Got My Love To Keep Me Warm".

Reception
Phoebe Luckhurst of Evening Standard stated, "It's Christmas — the lounge classics version! And Keb’ Mo’s blues-infused festive album is as schmaltzy as every holiday record." Stephen Thomas Erlewine of AllMusic wrote, "The inherent friendliness of Moonlight, Mistletoe and You buoys the first holiday album from veteran blues singer Keb' Mo' through its periodic shifts in tone and style... The entire album is a celebration."

Track listing

Acoustic Guitar – Keb Mo (tracks: 2, 9)
David Rodgers (tracks: 10), Lendell Black (tracks: 2, 7), Michael B. Hicks (tracks: 9), Tyler Summers (tracks: 3, 7) - Arranged By

Hollie Hammer (tracks: 3), Jason Eskridge (tracks: 3), Michael B. Hicks* (tracks: 3), Theron Thomas II (tracks: 3) - Backing Vocals

Baritone Saxophone – Ryan Middagh (tracks: 10)

Bass – Joe Reed (tracks: 2 to 4), Reggie McBride (tracks: 7), Steve Mackey (tracks: 1, 6, 8)

Cello – Carole Rabinowitz (tracks: 2, 7)

Drum – Neil Tufano (tracks: 10)
Drums – Chester Thompson (tracks: 2 to 4), Les Falconer (tracks: 7), Marcus Finnie (tracks: 1, 6), Neil Tufano (tracks: 5), Steve Jordan (tracks: 10)

Electric Guitar – Akil Thompson (tracks: 1 to 4, 6, 8), Keb Mo (tracks: 3)

Electric Upright Bass – Christian McBride (tracks: 10), Scott Mulvahill (tracks: 5)

Grand Piano – Shelly Berg (tracks: 10)

Guitar – Keb Mo (tracks: 1, 4 to 8, 10), Mike Pachelli (tracks: 7)

Keyboards – David Rodgers (tracks: 1, 6, 8), Phil Madeira (tracks: 2 to 4)

Organ – Phil Madeira (tracks: 3)

Percussion – Marcus Finnie (tracks: 10)

Piano – David Rodgers (tracks: 2, 7, 10), Michael B. Hicks (tracks: 3), Phil Madeira (tracks: 2)

Saxophone, Flute – Alex Graham (tracks: 10), Jovan Quallo (tracks: 10)

Tenor Saxophone – Evan Cobb (tracks: 7), Tyler Summers (tracks: 3, 7)

Trombone – Roland Barber (tracks: 10), Roy Agee (tracks: 3, 7, 10)

Trumpet – Quentin Ware (tracks: 10), Steve Patrick (tracks: 10), Vinnie Ciesielski (tracks: 3, 7)

Viola – Betsy Lamb (tracks: 2, 7), Simona Ruso (tracks: 2, 7)

Violin – Conni Ellisor (tracks: 2, 7), David Angell (tracks: 2, 7), David Davidson (tracks: 2, 7), Janet Darnall (tracks: 2, 7), Jenny Bifano (tracks: 2, 7), Kevin Winkelmann (tracks: 2, 7)

Vocals – Carter Moore (tracks: 9), Keb Mo, Melissa Manchester (tracks: 7), The Children Of NIA House Montessori School (tracks: 9)

Charts

Year-end charts

References 

2019 albums
Keb' Mo' albums